Charles Joseph McDermott Jr. (born April 6, 1990) is an American television and film actor, and musician, best known for his role as Axl Heck on ABC's The Middle. He was nominated for the Independent Spirit Award for Best Supporting Male for his performance in the acclaimed film Frozen River.

Life and career
McDermott briefly attended high school at Salesianum in Wilmington, Delaware before enrolling in, and graduating from, 8PA Leadership Charter School (PALCS), an online school in Pennsylvania. He moved to Los Angeles at the age of 16.

Since 2004, he has worked on a wide range of television series, including The Office and Private Practice. His biggest roles to date are as Axl Heck on the TV show The Middle, Wild Bill in Disappearances, and T.J. Eddy in Frozen River. In 2008, he received a nomination for an Independent Spirit Award as Best Supporting Actor for his Frozen River performance.

In 2017, McDermott married Sara Rejaie.

Filmography

Film

Television

Awards

References

External links
 Official website
 

1990 births
Living people
Male actors from Pennsylvania
American male child actors
American male film actors
American male television actors
People from West Chester, Pennsylvania
21st-century American male actors
Salesianum School alumni